Lissonomimus is a genus of beetles in the family Cerambycidae, containing the following species:

 Lissonomimus auratopilosus Di Iorio, 1998
 Lissonomimus megaderinus (Lane, 1973)

References

Trachyderini
Cerambycidae genera